The Clarion Golden Eagles wrestling team represents PennWest Clarion in Clarion, Pennsylvania in wrestling. 

The squad is coached by Keith Feraro who replaced Troy Letters. Letter's replaced Matt Derlan, who is now the coach of the Binghamton Bearcats. Derlan replaced Teague Moore who left the Clarion collegiate wrestling program to become the head coach at American University. 

The Golden Eagles wrestle in the Mid-American Conference (MAC) and as of the 2018-2019 season participated in the Pennsylvania State Athletic Conference (PSAC) as well. The Eagles were members of the Eastern Wrestling League until the end of the 2018–19 season when all members of the EWL accepted affiliate membership in the MAC for wrestling starting in the 2019–20 season. They qualify for the NCAA Division I Wrestling Championships as Division I members of the MAC. The PSAC comprises both Division I and II squads. 

Notable former Golden Eagle wrestlers include national champions Wade Schalles and Kurt Angle, who after leaving Clarion would go on to win a gold medal in the 1996 Summer Olympics before embarking on a career in professional wrestling.

National Collegiate Athletic Association National Champions

Team Championships

Rankings

Clarion's wrestling program earned its highest ever dual meet ranking in 1986.  The Golden Eagles went on to finish the season undefeated, with a record of 17–0–1.  The 1986 season was the third season in Clarion's history in which the Golden Eagles finished without a loss.

NWCA Division I National Dual Meet Wrestling Rankings (February 3, 1986)

University of Iowa
Iowa State University
Clarion University
Penn State University
University of Wisconsin
Bloomsburg University
University of Oklahoma
University of North Carolina
University of Northern Iowa
Oklahoma State University

Clarion University Golden Eagles Wrestling Head Coaches

References

 
1959 establishments in Pennsylvania
Sports clubs established in 1959